Rally & Issues was a conservative political party in the Principality of Monaco. The party was the main party in the coalition Horizon Monaco after the 2013 Monegasque general election.

History

The party was established as the National and Democratic Union in 1962 by a merger of the National Union of Independents and the National Democratic Entente, who between them held all 18 seats in the National Council. The new party won 17 of the 18 seats in the 1963 elections, and all 18 in the 1968 elections. It was reduced to 16 seats in 1973 as two opposition parties won seats, but won every seat again in the 1978, 1983 and 1988 elections.

In the 1993 elections it lost three seats, but retained a large majority. It won all 18 seats again in 1998, but the 2003 elections saw it win just three seats as it was defeated by the Union for Monaco alliance. It changed its name to Rally & Issues prior to the 2008 elections, and incorporated the Rally for Monaco as well as Values and Issues.

Electoral history

National Council elections

References

External links
  (Archived)

Defunct political parties in Monaco
Political parties established in 1962
Political parties disestablished in 2020
Monarchist parties in Monaco
1962 establishments in Monaco